At one time, four NASCAR races were known as the Camping World RV Sales 200:

 For the NASCAR Xfinity Series race at New Hampshire Motor Speedway from 2007–present, see ROXOR 200
 For the NASCAR Xfinity Series fall race at Dover International Speedway from 2008–present, see Use Your Melon Drive Sober 200
 For the NASCAR Camping World Truck Series race at The Milwaukee Mile from 2008 to 2009, see Copart 200
 For the NASCAR Camping World Truck Series race at Gateway International Raceway from 2009–present, see CarShield 200